Van Gundy is a Dutch surname.  Notable people with the surname include:

Arthur B. VanGundy, former professor for communication, book author and expert on creative problem-solving
Bill Van Gundy, former college basketball coach, father of Jeff and Stan
Doug Van Gundy, American poet and musician
Jeff Van Gundy (born 1962), former coach of the National Basketball Association's Houston Rockets and New York Knicks, brother of Stan and son of Bill
Stan Van Gundy (born 1959), head coach and president of basketball operations of the National Basketball Association's Detroit Pistons, brother of Jeff and son of Bill

See also
Gundy (surname)

Dutch-language surnames
Surnames of Dutch origin